Lovre Knežević (born 22 July 1998) is a Croatian professional footballer who plays as a midfielder.

Club career
He has played for Lučko, Hrvatski Dragovoljac and Zadar in the Croatian Second League, for Kufstein in Austria, for Beltinci in Slovenia and for Arda and Etar Veliko Tarnovo in Bulgaria.

On 8 July 2022 he joined Istra 1961.

References

External links
 

1998 births
Living people
Sportspeople from Zadar
Association football midfielders
Croatian footballers
NK Lučko players
NK Hrvatski Dragovoljac players
NK Zadar players
FC Arda Kardzhali players
SFC Etar Veliko Tarnovo players
NK Istra 1961 players
First Football League (Croatia) players
Austrian Regionalliga players
Slovenian Second League players
First Professional Football League (Bulgaria) players
Second Professional Football League (Bulgaria) players
Croatian Football League players
Croatian expatriate footballers
Expatriate footballers in Austria
Croatian expatriate sportspeople in Austria
Expatriate footballers in Slovenia
Croatian expatriate sportspeople in Slovenia
Expatriate footballers in Bulgaria
Croatian expatriate sportspeople in Bulgaria